It's Time is the tenth studio album by Singaporean singer Stefanie Sun, released on 8 March 2011 by Wonderful Music. The album sold more than 75,000 copies in Taiwan alone, and became the second best-selling album of the year in Taiwan.

Track listing

References

Stefanie Sun albums
2011 albums